was an athletic stadium in Aomori, Aomori, Japan.

References

External links
Official site

Sports venues in Aomori (city)
Defunct football venues in Japan
1966 establishments in Japan
Sports venues completed in 1966
Athletics (track and field) venues in Japan
2019 disestablishments in Japan
ReinMeer Aomori